This list of Russian electrical engineers includes the electrical engineers, inventors and physicist from the Russian Empire, the Soviet Union and the Russian Federation.

See also the :Category:Russian electrical engineers.

Alphabetical list


A
Zhores Alferov, physicist, inventor of heterotransistor, Nobel Prize winner

B
Pyotr Bagration, inventor of dry galvanic cell and gold electroplating
Lev Belkind, engineer and historian of science, author of the several biographies of famous Russian and foreign electrical engineers
Nikolay Benardos, inventor of carbon arc welding (the first practical arc welding method)
Mikhail Bonch-Bruevich, co-inventor of flip-flop and reflex klystron, major developer of radiolocation
Mikhail Botvinnik, three times World Chess Champion, earned his doctorate in electrical engineering

D
Mikhail Dolivo-Dobrovolsky, inventor of three-phase electric power

G
Boris Galitzine, inventor of electric seismograph

I
Andronik Iosifyan, father of Soviet electromechanics, chief constructor of the first Soviet meteorological satellites, inventor of noncontact synchronized transmissions

J
Boris Jacobi, inventor of electroplating, electrotyping, galvanoplastic sculpture and electric boat

K
Konstantin Khrenov, inventor of underwater welding
Danil Khomenkho, inventor of nano capacitive touch screens

L
Dmitry Lachinov, inventor of economizer for electricity consumption, electrical insulation tester and optical dynamometer, pioneer of long-distance electricity transmission
Alexander Lodygin, one of the inventors of incandescent light bulb, inventor of electric streetlight and tungsten filament
Oleg Losev, inventor of light-emitting diode and crystadine

P
Vasily Petrov, inventor of electric arc and arc welding
Fyodor Pirotsky, inventor of railway electrification system and electric tram
Alexander Poniatoff, inventor of videotape recorder
Alexander Popov, inventor of lightning detector, one of the inventors of radio

R
Georg Wilhelm Richmann, inventor of electrometer, died from ball lightning during an experiment
Boris Rosing, the first to use cathode ray tube in a TV system

S
Pavel Schilling, inventor of shielded cable, electric mine and electromagnetic telegraph
Nikolay Slavyanov, inventor of shielded metal arc welding
Aleksandr Stoletov, physicist, inventor of photoelectric cell

T
Leon Theremin, polymath, inventor of interlace, theremin (the first successful electronic musical instrument), terpsitone and rhythmicon (the first drum machine)

Y
Pavel Yablochkov, inventor of Yablochkov candle (the first commercially viable electric lamp), AC transformer and headlamp

Z
Vladimir Zworykin, "the Father of television", inventor of iconoscope and kinescope

See also

List of electrical engineers
Electrical engineering
List of Russian inventors

Electrical engineers
Russian